Potchefstroom Dam is a water reservoir (dam) on the Mooi River, on the northern boundary of Potchefstroom, North-West, South Africa. It was established in 1950.

See also
List of reservoirs and dams in South Africa
List of rivers of South Africa

References 
 List of South African Dams from the Department of Water Affairs

Dams in South Africa
Dams completed in 1950